Take You Home may refer to:

 "Take You Home" (A1 song), 2009 
 "Take You Home" (Baekhyun song), 2017
 "Secret (Take You Home)", a song by Kylie Minogue from the album Body Language
 "Take You Home" (featuring Kelis), a song by Angie Martinez
 "Take You Home" (featuring Lil' Mo), a song by Fabolous from the album Ghetto Fabolous
 "Take You Home", a song by Annie from the album Don't Stop
 "Take You Home", a song by Anthony Hamilton from the album What I'm Feelin'
 "Take You Home", a song by Dido from Still on My Mind
 "Take You Home", a song by Hardline from the album Human Nature
 "Take You Home", a song by Benji Hughes from the album Songs in the Key of Animals
 "Take You Home", a song by Lloyd from the album Street Love
 "Take You Home", a song by Thomas Rhett from the album It Goes Like This
 "Take You Home", a song by Scars on 45 from the album Safety in Numbers
 "Take You Home", a song by Sloppy Seconds from the album Destroyed

See also
 "Take Ya Home", a 2002 song by Lil' Bow Wow
 Take Me Home (disambiguation)
 "I Wonder If I Take You Home", a 1984 song by Lisa Lisa and Cult Jam